Birthe Hegstad (born 23 July 1966) is a Norwegian former footballer who played for Klepp IL and for the Norway women's national football team.

She played on the Norwegian team that won silver medals at the 1991 FIFA Women's World Cup in China. At the final of UEFA Women's Euro 1993 Hegstad scored the only goal against hosts Italy in Cesena. Her clubs include SK Sprint/Jeløy, Klepp IL, IL Jardar and FK Athene Moss. She also played varsity college soccer in the United States for North Carolina Tar Heels.

After her football career Hegstad became manager of the Coop Mega chain of supermarkets.

References

External links
 
 Norway national team profile 

1966 births
Living people
Norwegian women's footballers
Norway women's international footballers
1991 FIFA Women's World Cup players
North Carolina Tar Heels women's soccer players
Norwegian expatriate sportspeople in the United States
Norwegian expatriate women's footballers
Expatriate women's soccer players in the United States
Toppserien players
Athene Moss players
SK Sprint-Jeløy (women) players
Klepp IL players
UEFA Women's Championship-winning players
Women's association football forwards
Footballers from Trondheim